The Cephissus, called the Boeotian Cephissus to distinguish it from other rivers of the same name, or Kifisos is a river in central Greece. In Greek mythology, the river god Cephissus was associated with this river. The river rises at Lilaia in Phocis, on the northwestern slope of Mount Parnassus. It flows east through the Boeotian plain, passing the towns Amfikleia, Kato Tithorea and Orchomenos. It drained into Lake Copais, which was therefore also called the Cephisian Lake, until 1887, when the lake was drained. An artificial outflow has been created to Lake Yliki (ancient Hylice), further east.

Pausanias records a Theban tradition that the river Cephissus formerly flowed under a mountain and entered the sea until Heracles blocked the passage and diverted the water into the Orchomenian plain. Pausanias also says that the Lilaeans on certain days threw cakes and other customary items into the spring of the Cephissus and that they would reappear in the Castalian Spring.

The Cephissus valley is of strategic importance, connecting northern Greece via the passes of Mount Oeta and Mount Kallidromo (including Thermopylae) to southern Greece and the Gulf of Corinth. As a result, in the Frankish period a chain of forts and watchtowers was established along its course by the rulers of the Duchy of Athens.

References

External links

Landforms of Boeotia
Rivers of Central Greece
Rivers of Greece